Viva Riva! is a 2010 Congolese crime thriller film written and directed by Djo Tunda Wa Munga. Starring Patsha Bay, Manie Malone, Fabrice Kwizera, Hoji Fortuna, Marlene Longage, Alex Herabo & Diplôme Amekindra, the film received 12 nominations and won 6 awards at the 7th Africa Movie Academy Awards.

This  includes the awards for Best Picture, Best Director, Best Cinematography & Best Production Design, a feat that made it the highest winning film in the history of the AMAA's till date. Viva Riva! also won at the 2011 MTV Movie Awards for Best African Movie.

Plot

The film follows a fuel smuggler, Riva, after he brings a fuel shipment into Kinshasa.  Riva is pursued by an Angolan gangster, Cesar, who wants the fuel.  Cesar uses blackmail to gain the help of a local military officer, the Commandant, who then accesses a local informant and church resources to aid Cesar's search.  Meanwhile, Riva falls for Nora, the partner of a local gangster, Azor.  Riva gains the trust of a local boy and uses his help to find Nora again.  The conflicts turn out to be deadly for almost all the main characters.

Cast
 Patsha Bay - Riva
 Manie Malone - Nora
 Hoji Fortuna - Cesar
 Fabrice Kwizera - Jason
 Marlene Longage - The Commandant
 Alex Herabo
 Diplôme Amekindra

Reception
Reviews have been very positive. On Rotten Tomatoes it has an approval rating of 87% based on reviews from 60 critics. The site's consensus states: "Vibrant and violent, Viva Riva is a stylish, fast-paced crime drama.". On Metacritic it has a score of 65% based on 16 reviews.

References

External links
 
 

2010 films
2010 crime thriller films
Democratic Republic of the Congo drama films
2010s French-language films
Lingala-language films
Best Film Africa Movie Academy Award winners
Films set in the Democratic Republic of the Congo
Films shot in the Democratic Republic of the Congo
Best Cinematography Africa Movie Academy Award winners
Best Production Design Africa Movie Academy Award winners
African crime films